A penumbral lunar eclipse took place on Sunday, December 30, 2001, the last of three lunar eclipses in 2001.

Visibility

Related lunar eclipses

Eclipses of 2001 
 A total lunar eclipse on January 9.
 A total solar eclipse on June 21.
 A partial lunar eclipse on July 5.
 An annular solar eclipse on December 14.
 A penumbral lunar eclipse on December 30.

Lunar year series

Saros cycle 
Lunar Saros series 144, repeating every 18 years and 11 days, has a total of 71 lunar eclipse events including 20 total lunar eclipses.

First Penumbral Lunar Eclipse: 1749 Jul 29

First Partial Lunar Eclipse: 2146 Mar 28

First Total Lunar Eclipse: 2308 Jul 04

First Central Lunar Eclipse: 2362 Aug 06

Greatest Eclipse of the Lunar Saros 144: 2416 Sep 07

Last Central Lunar Eclipse: 2488 Oct 20

Last Total Lunar Eclipse: 2651 Jan 28

Last Partial Lunar Eclipse: 2867 Jun 08

Last Penumbral Lunar Eclipse: 3011 Sep 04

Half-Saros cycle
A lunar eclipse will be preceded and followed by solar eclipses by 9 years and 5.5 days (a half saros). This lunar eclipse is related to two partial solar eclipses of Solar Saros 151.

See also 
List of lunar eclipses
List of 21st-century lunar eclipses

References

External links 
 Saros cycle 144
 

2001-12
2001 in science